Jürg Berger (born February 5, 1954) is a retired Swiss professional ice hockey forward. He spent the majority of his career with the SCL Tigers in the National League A. He also represented the Swiss national team at the 1976 Winter Olympics.

References

External links

1954 births
Living people
Ice hockey players at the 1976 Winter Olympics
Olympic ice hockey players of Switzerland
SCL Tigers players
Swiss ice hockey left wingers